This is a list of bridges and tunnels on the National Register of Historic Places in the U.S. state of Montana.

References

 
Montana
Bridges on the National Register of Historic Places
Bridges on the National Register of Historic Places